Academically Adrift: Limited Learning on College Campuses is a book written by Richard Arum and Josipa Roksa, published by the University of Chicago Press in January 2011.

The book examines the current state of higher education in the United States. The book and its findings received extensive national media coverage and sparked a debate about what undergraduate students learn once they get into college.

The research draws on transcript data, the Collegiate Learning Assessment, and survey responses from more than 2,300 undergraduates at twenty-four institutions in their first semester and again at the end of their second year. The analysis reveals that 45 percent of these students demonstrated no significant improvement in a range of skills—including critical thinking, complex reasoning, and writing—during their first two years of college.

See also
In the Basement of the Ivory Tower
Real Education
UnCollege

Reviews
 
 
 
 
The New Yorker

References

Books about education
University of Chicago Press books
2011 non-fiction books